(also known as Rurouni Kenshin: Origins in North America) is a 2012 Japanese period action-adventure film based on the manga of the same name written and illustrated by Nobuhiro Watsuki. Directed by Keishi Ōtomo, the film stars Takeru Satoh and Emi Takei. It focuses on fictional events that take place during the early Meiji period in Japan, telling the story of a wanderer named Himura Kenshin, formerly known as the assassin Hitokiri Battōsai. After participating in the Bakumatsu war, Kenshin wanders the countryside of Japan offering protection and aid to those in need as atonement for the murders he once committed.

Rumors circulated of a live-action adaptation of the manga before it was announced. The Sankei Sports newspaper reported that the staff aimed to release the film internationally and eventually make a series. This was the first live-action adaptation of the manga. During the production, Watsuki offered his ideas for the movie, which were used in the film. The film was distributed internationally by Warner Bros.

Rurouni Kenshin was theatrically released on August 25, 2012, in Japan, grossing over $36 million domestically and over $60 million worldwide as of November 2012. The film was licensed for distribution in over 60 countries in Europe, Latin America and Asia. The movie premiered in North America as an opening selection for the 2012 LA EigaFest on December 14, 2012.

On June 14, 2016, Funimation Films announced that they acquired the rights to the film, as well as its sequels Kyoto Inferno and The Legend Ends. The film hit North American theatres in August 2016 with an English dub.

Plot
As the Imperialist forces celebrate their victory in the Battle of Toba–Fushimi, a participant known as the Hitokiri Battōsai walks away from the battlefield, abandoning his sword. But Battōsai's old katana is not left alone. It is claimed by one of the fallen, Udō Jin-e.

A decade later, Saitō Hajime and his fellow policemen investigate the murder of an undercover cop supposedly by the hands of the Battōsai. But Saitō is not convinced and suspects Takeda Kanryū, a wealthy, but cruel businessman. Meanwhile, the former Battōsai (now calling himself Himura Kenshin) arrives in Tokyo. While roaming its streets, he meets Kamiya Kaoru, the owner of her late father's Kendo school.

Elsewhere, Takani Megumi, a woman forced to make opium for Takeda Kanryū, escapes and turns to the police for a safe haven after witnessing the deaths of the other opium makers. However, Udō Jin-e, under the service of Kanryū, hunts her down, slaying everyone in the police station. Luckily, she escapes in the ensuing chaos.

Kaoru crosses paths with Jin-e, the actual perpetrator killing under her dojo's style of swordsmanship. Utterly no match for him, she is injured in the fight, but Kenshin appears out of nowhere and saves her. Jin-e immediately realizes Kenshin's hidden identity as the true Battōsai, before a swarm of policemen rush onto the scene, giving Kenshin and Kaoru a chance to flee. Kaoru leads Kenshin to her dojo where they will be safe. Later, a group of thugs under Takeda Kanryū attempt to take over the dojo. Kenshin beats down the entire gang without killing a single one before the police arrive. Kenshin takes the blame for the incident and gets himself arrested in order to help avoid Kaoru's dojo being blamed for the violence. Soon, Saitō recognizes him, briefly fights him when he refuses to help the police because he has vowed not to kill again and then releases him. After his release, he is greeted by Kaoru who knows Kenshin is not the Battōsai who had defamed her dojo and takes him back to the dojo. Kenshin afterward moves in with Kaoru and her only student, the boy Myōjin Yahiko.

Still running on the streets for her life, Megumi runs into Yahiko who helps hide her and brings her to the dojo where she is introduced to everyone. Kaoru treats everyone to a sukiyaki dinner at the Akabeko restaurant, only to have the occasion spoiled by Kanryū coming and offering to hire Kenshin, who humbly declines. Here, he is challenged by Sagara Sanosuke for the job and they leave the establishment to fight.

Later that evening, Jin-e goes on a killing spree leaving many corpses for the police to find the following day. Kenshin witnesses the horror, as well as a woman mourning the death of her lover. This evokes a memory for Kenshin from his years as an assassin when he witnessed a woman mourning a man that he had killed, a sword fight that left a scar on his face. Later that night, a masked man working for Kanryū warns Megumi of coming dangers.

The next day the people around the dojo fall ill from rat poison contaminating the community wells. Megumi suspects it is Kanryū's doing and helps by providing medication for the victims. Angry at Kanryū, Megumi attempts to kill him, but fails and is instead held hostage by the wealthy drug-dealer. Besting all his men, Kenshin and Sanosuke attack Kanryū's mansion in hopes of rescuing Megumi. Saitō assists them to subdue Kanryū, who is armed with a Gatling gun. They rescue Megumi, but discover that Jin-e, the fake Battōsai and Kanryū's man, has kidnapped Kaoru.

Kenshin pursues Jin-e. To further provoke Kenshin, Jin-e uses a special technique that paralyzes Kaoru's lungs and can only be undone with his death. After an intense battle, Kenshin critically injures Jin-e by shattering his elbow with his scabbard. Before Kenshin could land the killing blow, Kaoru overcomes the paralysis and stops Kenshin from killing Jin-e. Jin-e commits suicide, telling Kenshin before his last breath that he who lives by the sword must die by the sword, a re-occurring theme, counter to Kenshin's vow never to kill again.

Kenshin, tired and wounded, carries the unconscious Kaoru back to the dojo. They rest, in the care of Megumi and Yahiko. Upon waking up, Kaoru does not see Kenshin and goes in search for him. She finds him carrying back some vegetables, and is relieved of her fear that he may have left permanently.

Cast
Principal cast list:
 Takeru Satoh as Himura Kenshin, a former assassin turned wanderer who has made a vow never to kill again.
 Emi Takei as Kamiya Kaoru, the owner of a Kendo school left to her by her father.
 Munetaka Aoki as Sagara Sanosuke, a street fighter who befriends Kenshin.
 Yū Aoi as Takani Megumi, one of Kanryū's forced opium-makers, though from a famed family of doctors and healers. 
 Taketo Tanaka as Myojin Yahiko, a young boy and Kaoru's only student at the dojo.
 Yōsuke Eguchi as Saitō Hajime, a former member of the Shinsengumi who now works for the Meiji government as a police officer under the name of Fujita Gorō.
 Kōji Kikkawa as Udō Jin-e, one of Kanryū's men, and a survivor of the Battle of Toba-Fushimi. 
 Gō Ayano as Gein, another of Kanryū's men.
 Genki Sudo as Inui Banjin, another of Kanryū's men.
 Teruyuki Kagawa as Takeda Kanryū, a ruthless businessman.
 Masataka Kubota as Kiyosato Akira
 Eiji Okuda as Yamagata Aritomo
 Kaoru Hirata - Sekihara Tae
 Mei Nagano - Sanjō Tsubame
 Ichirōta Miyagawa as Katsura Kogorō

Production

On June 28, 2011, a live-action film adaptation of Rurouni Kenshin was announced. Produced by Warner Bros., with actual film production done by Studio Swan, the film was directed by Keishi Ōtomo and stars Takeru Satoh (of Kamen Rider Den-O fame) as Kenshin, Munetaka Aoki as Sanosuke Sagara and Emi Takei as Kaoru. Ōtomo said he aimed to make the live-action more complex than the original manga version. The film was released on August 25, 2012, and the staff "aims to release the film internationally and eventually make a series.

In 2012, Nobuhiro Watsuki revealed that he never turns down an offered project, whether it is a film, anime or game and that the first offer for a live-action film adaptation of Rurouni Kenshin came shortly after the manga ended. But that fizzled out before any real discussions had begun, so he felt a film would never happen. He got another offer about three years ago and it finally came to fruition after lengthy discussions. Watsuki said he was only involved in the script-writing phase, writing the first half and checking the second half written by others, but was told the script could be changed at the director's discretion. The original creator said he was by and large pleased with the film.

Ōtomo found Satoh a good fit for Kenshin's character after the two worked together in a previous film. After choosing Takeru Satoh as the lead, producer Shinzō Matsuhashi commented, "Satoh has the looks and stature to be a proper Kenshin." Watsuki added that when this project was just starting, he and his wife were discussing who should play Kenshin, and decided that Satoh topped the list.

Satoh later commented, "The role of Kenshin is that of a well-known character, therefore, I think fascinating acting is needed. I would like to create the Kenshin image with the staff, while staying true to the details. I will try my best, so please look forward to it."

Watsuki praised Satoh being cast for the role: "When this project just started, my wife and I were talking about who would suit the role of Kenshin, and Satoh Takeru-san was the one who came up on our mind first. So, when it was confirmed (that Satoh will be taking the role), I was surprised, but was also very happy. I'm looking forward to seeing his wonderful acting."

Release
Rurouni Kenshin was theatrically released on August 25, 2012, in Japan. The film was released in South Korea for the Busan International Film Festival on October 5, 2012. Released for Spain in the annual Sitges Film Festival on October 10, 2012. The film debuted in Hong Kong on December 6, 2012. It was also theatrically released in the Philippines on December 5, 2012 (SM Cinema) gaining second place in the Philippine Box Office on its first week.

It was released in DVD and Blu-ray in Japan on December 26, 2012. The film has been licensed for distribution in over 60 countries in Europe, Latin America and Asia. Limited edition came in a special box, with special digipack, a soundtrack, and a Rurouni Kenshin notebook. Other content also include cast and staff commentary, TV spots, behind-the-scenes, and all the trailers included, plus One OK Rock's PV of their song "The Beginning".

The film was released in North America on December 14, 2012, for the LA EigaFest 2012 and was held in conjunction with the American Cinematheque at the Egyptian Theatre in Hollywood. The director, Keishi Ōtomo, attended the premiere and opening red carpet ceremony. In addition to Rurouni Kenshin, the 2012 line up features some of the films to come out of Japan over the last year. A special screening of four selected short films will be presented in collaboration with the Short Shorts Film Festival & Asia.

The film was screened in the UK on October 4, 2013.

The film was released on Blu-ray and DVD by Funimation on November 1, 2016, in North America under the title Rurouni Kenshin: Origins, which includes an English dubbed version of the film, with a TV-MA rating.

Reception

Box office
The film became Japan's eleventh highest-grossing film of 2012, earning  at the Japanese box office that year. Internationally, the film grossed .

Critical reception
The film received mostly positive reviews from critics. Deborah Young, writing for The Hollywood Reporter, praised the film in the Busan Film Festival, saying that the "choreography is fast and furious and the sword fights ably showcase Battosai's incredible skills. Naoki Satō's energetic score pounds out the action scenes to a barbarian beat". 
Michelle Nguyen of Geek.com felt the film "treats the source material with respect and love" and said that it "...is many things: part Japanese historical drama, part action movie, and part nostalgic emotional journey. "More than just nostalgia, seeing Rurouni Kenshin in the flesh is a profound coming-to-Jesus like experience for fans of the franchise and newcomers alike. We have at last a film that shows what a live action adaptation of an anime should be like. Rurouni Kenshin bursts forth on the screen with heart and with sword, just as his name implies".

Nick Creamer of Anime News Network awarded the film an "A−", stating that "Kenshin: Origins smartly leans on one of the source material's great advantages: the inherently compelling nature of the transition from the Tokugawa to the Meiji era. Much of the film's thematic and emotional power comes from the poignancy of that transition – more than just a tale of samurai clashes, it presents an argument for both the great and terrible sides of both eras —" and goes on to say "Overall, I'd highly recommend Rurouni Kenshin: Origins to both fans of the original and fans of adventure films in general. Origins is action-packed, full of striking characters, and energetically composed, while also drawing smartly on the poignant context of its source material. It's an altogether terrific time."
Nobuhiro Watsuki overall praised the film. During an interview with Weekly Shonen Jump Alpha, he commented, "It was right on! Takeru Satoh played Kenshin’s dual personality well. He truly was Kenshin. Yōsuke Eguchi who played Saitō Hajime, Kōji Kikkawa who played Udō Jin-e, and Munetaka Aoki who played Sagara Sanosuke really took on their characters' expressions and movements in the action sequences. It drew me in, especially the scene with Saitō's Gatotsu pose. It sent chills down my spine! I thought Emi Takei playing Kamiya Kaoru was really cute and Yū Aoi playing Takani Megumi was also fantastic, and in the film parts I felt I didn't explain well enough in the manga were improved. There were actually lines in the movie that made me think 'I want to use that line in the manga!.

A more negative review came from Variety, with Hong Kong critic Maggie Lee writing that "Even though the 134-minute pic perks up whenever there's an action sequence, the story is too pedestrian to engage, and the excitement dips whenever dramatic exposition takes over". Lee also said that Takei and Satoh's portrayal of their characters romantic relationship "felt passionless", and that Egawa and Aoi seemed "inconsequential in their flat supporting roles".

Accolades

Sequels

When the film was first announced, it was reported that the production team had hopes to create a series.

The August 2013 issue of Jump SQ. announced that a two-part sequel would be released simultaneously in the summer of 2014. These movies were tentatively known as Rurouni Kenshin: The Great Kyoto Fire Arc and The Last of a Legend Arc, and have Satoh Takeru, Takei Emi and Eguchi Yosuke reprising their roles as Kenshin, Kaoru and Saitō respectively. It was announced that Tatsuya Fujiwara was cast in the role of Shishio Makoto on July 2, as was director Keishi Ōtomo's return. On July 30, it was revealed that Ryunosuke Kamiki and Yūsuke Iseya were cast as Seta Sōjirō and Shinomori Aoshi. On August 4, 2013, actors Min Tanaka, Kazufumi Miyazawa, Yukiyoshi Ozawa, Maryjun Takahashi and Ryosuke Miura were unveiled as Nenji Kashiwazaki/Okina, Toshimichi Ōkubo, Hirobumi Itō, Yumi Komagata and Chō Sawagejō. Kaito Ōyagi replaced Taketo Tanaka as Yahiko. On August 30, 2013, Tao Tsuchiya was announced as popular character Makimachi Misao.

In April 2019, Warner Bros. Japan announced a fourth and fifth film were in production. Satoh reprised his role as Kenshin and Ōtomo returned to direct, the films were scheduled for a Summer 2020 release. On 27 May 2020, it was announced on the official website that the release dates for the two sequels were postponed due to the COVID-19 pandemic. On 4 December 2020, the new dates were announced along with the sequel titles and renewed version of the movie poster. Rurouni Kenshin: The Final was released on 23 April 2021, while Rurouni Kenshin: The Beginning was released on 4 June 2021.

References

Further reading

External links

Official website
 
 
 Rurouni Kenshin review

2012 films
Funimation
Japanese action adventure films
2010s Japanese-language films
Jidaigeki films
Live-action films based on manga
Rurouni Kenshin films
Samurai films
Warner Bros. films
Films directed by Keishi Ōtomo
Japanese historical adventure films
Historical action films
Films set in 1868
Films set in 1878
Films set in the Meiji period
Films scored by Naoki Satō
2010s action adventure films
2010s historical adventure films
2010s Japanese films